= Onsra =

2026 single by comehelpglo

Single by comehelpglo
- Released: May 29, 2026
- Genre: Alternative hip-hop
- Length: 2:11
- Label: Listen to the Kids
- Songwriter: William Leiter
- Producer: Sandman

Comehelpglo singles chronology
"Killing Celebrities" (2026)	"Onsra" (2026)	"12 Leaky Windows" (2026)

Music video
- "Onsra" on YouTube

"Onsra" is a song by American rapper comehelpglo, released on May 29, 2026. It gained recognition through TikTok in September 2026.

== Charts ==
Chart performance for "Onsra"
Chart (2026)	Peak position
Canada (Canadian Hot 100)	29
US Billboard Hot 100	61
US Hot R&B/Hip-Hop Songs (Billboard)	14
US Rhythmic Airplay (Billboard)	30
